Swarna Gopuram is a 1984 Indian Malayalam film, directed by A. B. Ayyappan Nair and produced by S. Parameswaran. The film stars Sukumari, Ratheesh, V. D. Rajappan and Ajayan in the lead roles. The film has musical score by Johnson.

Cast

Sukumari as Johnny's mother
Ratheesh as Dr. Johny
V. D. Rajappan as Mathappan
Ajayan as Sreekanth
Abhin as Siddarthan
Jyothi as Mercy
P. K. Abraham as Siddharthan's father
Suchitra (old) as Mariya
Vandana as Renu
Jagannatha Varma as Mercy's father
Anandavally as Mercy's stepmother
Anuradha as Dancer

Soundtrack
The music was composed by Johnson and the lyrics were written by Dr K. Narayanankutty, S. L. Puram Anandakrishnan, Bichu Thirumala and Bharanikkavu Sivakumar.

References

External links
 

1984 films
1980s Malayalam-language films